Dogtown is a census-designated place in San Joaquin County, California. The 2020 United States census reported Dogtown's population was 2,643, which is up from 2,506 in the 2010 United States census.

Geography
According to the United States Census Bureau, the CDP covers an area of 13.0 square miles (33.6 km2), 99.83% of it land and 0.17% of it water.

Demographics
The 2010 United States Census reported that Dogtown had a population of 2,506. The racial makeup of Dogtown was 2,040 (81.4%) White, 15 (0.6%) African American, 23 (0.9%) Native American, 57 (2.3%) Asian, 2 (0.1%) Pacific Islander, 253 (10.1%) from other races, and 116 (4.6%) from two or more races. Hispanic or Latino of any race were 638 persons (25.5%).

The Census reported that 2,506 people (100% of the population) lived in households, 0 (0%) lived in non-institutionalized group quarters, and 0 (0%) were institutionalized.

There were 849 households, out of which 307 (36.2%) had children under the age of 18 living in them, 587 (69.1%) were opposite-sex married couples living together, 54 (6.4%) had a female householder with no husband present, 48 (5.7%) had a male householder with no wife present.  There were 46 (5.4%) unmarried opposite-sex partnerships, and 4 (0.5%) same-sex married couples or partnerships. 130 households (15.3%) were made up of individuals, and 55 (6.5%) had someone living alone who was 65 years of age or older. The average household size was 2.95.  There were 689 families (81.2% of all households); the average family size was 3.24.

The population was spread out, with 620 people (24.7%) under the age of 18, 205 people (8.2%) aged 18 to 24, 515 people (20.6%) aged 25 to 44, 811 people (32.4%) aged 45 to 64, and 355 people (14.2%) who were 65 years of age or older.  The median age was 42.9 years. For every 100 females, there were 102.9 males.  For every 100 females age 18 and over, there were 104.8 males.

The homeowner vacancy rate was 2.0%; the rental vacancy rate was 5.6%.  1,953 people (77.9% of the population) lived in owner-occupied housing units and 553 people (22.1%) lived in rental housing units.

References

Census-designated places in San Joaquin County, California
Census-designated places in California